Japanese youth culture  is a style for the youth and teen. The youth culture include Japanese idol, visual kei, Gothic Lolita, Nagoya kei and gyaru. The cultures such as Japanese idol and visual kei began as youth culture in  Japan.

History 
The youth culture in Japan began in the mid-1980s with the style visual kei with bands such as D'erlanger, X Japan and Buck Tick. In the 1990s the idol began with idol group Morning Musume. Other cultures for youth was Nagoya kei and Gothic Lolita. The youth culture in Japan began in the 1980s with cultures such as Japanese idol and visual kei. Japanese idol groups such as Cute, Morning Musume and Arashi began in the youth fans and teen fans. Visual kei bands such as An Cafe, Ayabie and Lynch. began with more fans of youth and teen and girl groups AKB48 and Berryz Kobo sing at more concerts in the Asia, USA and Europe. The gyaru began in the 2000s as youth culture and gyaru began in the song "Watchin' Girl" from alternative rock band Shonen Knife and Gothic Lolita began as youth culture in the 1990s and in the 2000s with Japanese visual kei rock musician Mana from visual kei bands Malice Mizer and Moi dix Mois.

Youth cultures 
 Nagoya kei, the subgenre of visual kei
 Visual kei
 Japanese idol
 Gothic Lolita
 Gyaru
 Gyaru-oh
 Para Para
 Cosplay
 Otaku

References